South Jutland is one of the 12 multi-member constituencies of the Folketing, the national legislature of Denmark. The constituency was established in 2007 following the public administration structural reform. It consists of the municipalities of Aabenraa, Billund, Esbjerg, Fanø, Fredericia, Haderslev, Kolding, Sønderborg, Tønder, Varde, Vejen and Vejle. The constituency currently elects 17 of the 179 members of the Folketing using the open party-list proportional representation electoral system. At the 2022 general election it had 526,547 registered electors.

Electoral system
South Jutland currently elects 17 of the 179 members of the Folketing using the open party-list proportional representation electoral system. Constituency seats are allocated using the D'Hondt method. Compensatory seats are calculated based on the national vote and are allocated using the Sainte-Laguë method, initially at the provincial level and finally at the constituency level. Only parties that reach any one of three thresholds stipulated by section 77 of the Folketing (Parliamentary) Elections Act - winning at least one constituency seat; obtaining at least the Hare quota (valid votes in province/number of constituency seats in province) in two of the three provinces; or obtaining at least 2% of the national vote - compete for compensatory seats.

Election results

Summary

(Excludes compensatory seats)

Detailed

2022
Results of the 2022 general election held on 1 November 2022:

Votes per municipality:<

The following candidates were elected:
 Constituency seats - Karina Adsbøl (Æ), 3,567 votes; Henrik Dahl (I), 5,779 votes; Benny Engelbrecht (A), 10,657 votes; Søren Espersen (Æ), 4,996 votes; Henrik Frandsen (M), 6,206 votes; Niels Flemming Hansen (C), 2,452 votes; Mette Kierkgaard (M), 2,935 votes; Anders Kronborg (A), 7,407 votes; Karina Lorentzen (F), 5,139 votes; Christian Rabjerg Madsen (A), 7,643 votes; Anni Matthiesen (V), 14,209 votes; Christoffer Aagaard Melson (V), 10,706 votes; Jesper Petersen (A), 8,701 votes; Hans Christian Schmidt (V), 8,046 votes; Kris Jensen Skriver (A), 3,723 votes; Pernille Vermund (D), 15,375 votes; and Birgitte Vind (A), 7,116 votes.
 Compensatory seats - Helena Artmann Andresen (I), 1,143 votes; Peter Kofod (O), 3,887 votes; Kenneth Fredslund Petersen (Æ), 782 votes; Søren Egge Rasmussen (Ø), 1,637 votes; and Lotte Rod (B), 2,714 votes.

2019
Results of the 2019 general election held on 5 June 2019:

Votes per municipality:

The following candidates were elected:
 Constituency seats - Karina Adsbøl (O), 1,526 votes; Kristian Thulesen Dahl (O), 23,142 votes; Benny Engelbrecht (A), 22,095 votes; Eva Kjer Hansen (V), 17,321 votes; Niels Flemming Hansen (C), 10,234 votes; Marie Krarup (O), 1,618 votes; Anders Kronborg (A), 17,044 votes; Karina Lorentzen (F), 4,698 votes; Christian Rabjerg Madsen (A), 12,940 votes; Anni Matthiesen (V), 17,292 votes; Christoffer Aagaard Melson (V), 13,750 votes; Ellen Trane Nørby (V), 21,997 votes; Jesper Petersen (A), 13,392 votes; Troels Ravn (A), 11,717 votes; Lotte Rod (B), 4,872 votes; Hans Christian Schmidt (V), 17,344 votes; Ulla Tørnæs (V), 12,412 votes; and Birgitte Vind (A), 14,942 votes.
 Compensatory seats - Henrik Dahl (I), 1,737 votes; Henning Hyllested (Ø), 3,813 votes; and Pernille Vermund (D), 13,391 votes.

2015
Results of the 2015 general election held on 18 June 2015:

Votes per municipality:

The following candidates were elected:
 Constituency seats - Karina Adsbøl (O), 4,989 votes; Mette Bock (I), 23,544 votes; Jan Rytkjær Callesen (O), 5,097 votes; Bjarne Corydon (A), 22,277 votes; Kristian Thulesen Dahl (O), 90,724 votes; Susanne Eilersen (O), 3,940 votes; Benny Engelbrecht (A), 14,374 votes; Eva Kjer Hansen (V), 12,342 votes; Carl Holst (V), 18,851 votes; Henning Hyllested (Ø), 5,939 votes; Marie Krarup (O), 4,026 votes; Karen J. Klint (A), 12,340 votes; Christian Rabjerg Madsen (A), 129,955 votes; Anni Matthiesen (V), 11,274 votes; Ellen Trane Nørby (V), 17,179 votes; Jesper Petersen (A), 12,042 votes; Peter Kofod Poulson (O), 5,623 votes; and Hans Christian Schmidt (V), 11,442 votes.
 Compensatory seats - Henrik Dahl (I), 5,991 votes; and Lotte Rod (B), 4,871 votes.

2011
Results of the 2011 general election held on 15 September 2011:

Votes per municipality:

The following candidates were elected:
 Constituency seats - Karina Adsbøl (O), 2,993 votes; Jacob Bjerregaard (A), 12,916 votes; Mette Bock (I), 16,751 votes; Peter Christensen (V), 19,563 votes; Bjarne Corydon (A), 15,980 votes; Kristian Thulesen Dahl (O), 45,096 votes; Jørn Dohrmann (O), 6,387 votes; Benny Engelbrecht (A), 14,137 votes; Eva Kjer Hansen (V), 20,346 votes; Karen J. Klint (A), 10,351 votes; Karina Lorentzen Dehnhardt (F), 7,912 votes; Anni Matthiesen (V), 10,537 votes; Ellen Trane Nørby (V), 27,793 votes; Troels Ravn (A), 9,108 votes; Lotte Rod (B), 11,196 votes; Hans Christian Schmidt (V), 17,470 votes; Hans Christian Thoning (V), 12,240 votes; and Ulla Tørnæs (V), 15,123 votes.
 Compensatory seats - Henning Hyllested (Ø), 3,487 votes; Marie Krarup (O), 2,900 votes; Mike Legarth (C), 5,145 votes; Marlene B. Lorentzen (B), 6,190 votes; and Jesper Petersen (F), 6,071 votes.

2007
Results of the 2007 general election held on 13 November 2007:

Votes per municipality:

The following candidates were elected:
 Constituency seats - Mogens Camre (O), 7,276 votes; Carina Christensen (C), 13,833 votes; Jørn Dohrmann (O), 22,490 votes; Benny Engelbrecht (A), 11,645 votes; Eva Kjer Hansen (V), 30,909 votes; Karen J. Klint (A), 12,422 votes; Søren Krarup (O), 14,159 votes; Kim Mortensen (A), 16,109 votes; Ellen Trane Nørby (V), 19,484 votes; Jesper Petersen (F), 3,076 votes; Julie Rademacher (A), 10,514 votes; Preben Rudiengaard (V), 15,079 votes; Hans Christian Schmidt (V), 15,905 votes; Lise von Seelen (A), 9,361 votes; Villy Søvndal (F), 33,733 votes; Hans Christian Thoning (V), 11,613 votes; Ulla Tørnæs (V), 11,801 votes; and Jens Vibjerg (V), 11,252 votes.
 Compensatory seats - Peter Christensen (V), 10,841 votes; Bente Dahl (B), 3,363 votes; Mike Legarth (C), 4,411 votes; Karina Lorentzen (F), 1,251 votes; Karin Nødgaard (O), 5,765 votes; and Jørgen Poulsen (Y), 5,459 votes.

References

Folketing constituencies
Folketing constituencies established in 2007
Folketing constituency